San Luis District is the smallest of four districts of the province San Pablo in Peru.

References